The 2018 Quebec Scotties Tournament of Hearts, the provincial women's curling championship of Quebec, was held from January 9 to 14 at the Club de curling Etchemin in Saint-Romuald, Quebec. The winning Émilia Gagné team represented Quebec at the 2018 Scotties Tournament of Hearts.

Teams
The teams are listed as follows:

Standings
Final round-robin standings

Scores

Draw 1
January 9, 8:00 pm

Draw 2
January 10, 11:00 am

Draw 3
January 10, 4:00 pm

Draw 4
January 11, 1:00 pm

Draw 5
January 11, 7:00 pm

Draw 6
January 12, 1:00 pm

Draw 7
January 12, 7:00 pm

Tiebreaker
Saturday, January 13, 14:30

Playoffs

Semifinal
Saturday, January 13, 19:00

Final
Sunday, January 14, 11:00

References

Quebec
Scotties Tournament of Hearts, 2018
Lévis, Quebec
2018 in Quebec
January 2018 sports events in Canada